Jiang Jie may refer to:
 Jiang Zhuyun, Chinese communist resistance fighter and revolutionary martyr
 Jiang Jie (artist), Chinese artist